ListenBrainz is a free and open source project that aims to crowdsource listening data from digital music and release it under an open license. It is a MetaBrainz Foundation project tied to MusicBrainz.

ListenBrainz takes submissions from media players and services such as Music Player Daemon, Spotify, and Rhythmbox in the form of listens. ListenBrainz can also import Last.fm and Libre.fm scrobbles in order to build listening history. As listens are released under an open license, ListenBrainz is useful for music research for industry and development purposes.

ListenBrainz can also generate recommendations and playlists based on individual listening.

References

External links
 ListenBrainz

 
Free-content websites
Recommender systems